Blackwood (also called Blackwood Springs) is an unincorporated community in Gordon County, in the U.S. state of Georgia.

History
A post office called Blackwood was established in 1884, and remained in operation until being discontinued in 1901. Blackwood was named in honor of a Native American (Indian) chief.

References

Unincorporated communities in Gordon County, Georgia
Unincorporated communities in Georgia (U.S. state)